Figure skating at the 2011 Winter Universiade included a men's event for senior level skaters. The short program was held on February 1 and the free skating on February 2, 2011.

Results

Judges
 Referee: Ms. Gale TANGER (ISU)
 Technical Controller: Ms. Vera TAUCHMANOVA (ISU)
 Technical Specialist: Ms. Wilhelmina VAN VEEN (ISU)
 Assistant Technical Specialist: Ms. Vanessa GUSMEROLI (ISU)
 Judge No.1: Ms. Isabelle BERNARD BRULS 
 Judge No.2: Ms. Jia YAO 
 Judge No.3: Ms. Natalia BOGUSH 
 Judge No.4: Ms. Masako KUBOTA 
 Judge No.5: Ms. Beatrice PFISTER 
 Judge No.6: Mr. Yury BALKOV 
 Judge No.7: Ms. Senem AHISKAL 
 Data Operator: Mr. Alexander KUZNETSOV (ISU)
 Replay Operator: Mr. Wieland LUEDERS (ISU)

References

External links
 Detailed results

Winter Universiade
Winter Universiade
Men's singles